Kaihon Kug, also historically known as Old Quijotoa Well, is a populated place situated in Pima County, Arizona, United States. Kaihon Kug became officially recognized as its name by a decision of the Board on Geographic Names (BGN) in 1941. The name means "box stands" in the O'odham language, although kaihon is a borrowed word from the Spanish, cajon. At the time of the BGN decision, there was some discussion as to the spelling of the two words; the board decided to use the O'odham spelling for Kaihon, and chose Kug, rather than Kuk, to diminish any confusion with the O'odham word for "cries".

Notes

References

Populated places in Pima County, Arizona